The Nubian flapshell turtle or Nubian soft-shelled turtle (Cyclanorbis elegans) is one of two species of softshell turtle in the genus Cyclanorbis of the Trionychidae family. It is thought to have ranged from West Africa east through Central Africa to South Sudan, although it has been extirpated from the vast majority of its range.

Distribution 
It has historically been found in a wide range spanning Benin, Central African Republic, Chad, Ethiopia, Ghana, Nigeria, Sudan, and Togo. However, it has been very rarely recorded during the last 50 years and there is little hope that the species is extant in West Africa. In 2017, a remnant population was found in the White Nile wetlands in South Sudan by Prof. Luca Luiselli and his team; this discovery was publicized in a 2019 paper. In 2021, another population was found along the White Nile wetlands in northern Uganda, near the border with South Sudan; the species was not previously recorded in this area.

Description 
The Nubian flapshell turtle can reach a length of up to 70 cm (27.5 in).

Conservation 
The Nubian flapshell turtle's habitat is located in politically very unstable areas which results in habitat loss. In addition the turtles are hunted as bushmeat. In addition, some Chinese expatriates in the area are known to pay high prices to fishermen for catching turtles, and they are used for both consumption and religious veneration. Some turtles may also be exported to Asia for the food trade. Bari fishermen in the area have extensive knowledge of the life history of Nubian flapshell turtles, including their nesting grounds, and this may be useful in conserving the species.

References

External links
 
 

Cyclanorbis
Turtles of Africa
Reptiles of Cameroon
Reptiles of the Central African Republic
Reptiles of Nigeria
Reptiles of South Sudan
Vertebrates of Sudan
Reptiles of West Africa
Taxa named by John Edward Gray
Reptiles described in 1869
Taxonomy articles created by Polbot